Terrebonne station is a commuter rail station operated by Exo in Terrebonne, Quebec, Canada. It is served by the Mascouche line. 

Despite its name, it is located some 9 km from the town centre of Terrebonne, instead serving the district of Lachenaie, a former municipality that was merged with Terrebonne in 2001. 

The station is located on the median of Quebec Autoroute 640. It possesses a single track and a single side platform. The platform is a high-level platform, a feature shared only with Gare Centrale, Repentigny, and Mascouche stations on the commuter train network. The station has a single exit, reached via an enclosed overhead bridge passing over the eastbound autoroute lane to reach the main parking lot, with stair and elevator access. As a result, the station is wheelchair-accessible. The parking lot and adjacent bus loop are reached from Boulevard Marcel-Therrien. 

An artwork by Patrick Coutu, an aluminum and stainless steel sculpture entitled Myriade, stands in the parking lot near the station entrance.

Bus Connections

MRC Les Moulins (Urbis) (MRCLM)

References

External links
 Terrebonne Commuter Train Station Information (RTM)
 Terrebonne Commuter Train Station Schedule (RTM)

Exo commuter rail stations
Transport in Terrebonne, Quebec
Railway stations in Lanaudière
Railway stations in Quebec